Alberada is a genus of snout moths in the subfamily Phycitinae. It was described by C. Heinrich in 1939. Some sources list it as a synonym of Zophodia, while others retain it as a valid genus.

Species
 Alberada bidentella (Dyar, 1908) 
 Alberada californiensis Neunzig, 1997  
 Alberada candida Neunzig, 1997  
 Alberada franclemonti Neunzig, 1997  
 Alberada parabates (Dyar, 1913)

References

Phycitini
Pyralidae genera